Drasteria axuana is a moth of the family Erebidae. It is found in Mongolia, China (Tibet, Qinghai, Xinjiang) and north-western Pakistan.

Subspecies
Drasteria axuana axuana (China, Pakistan)
Drasteria axuana fumiluna Wiltshire, 1969 (Mongolia)

References

Drasteria
Moths described in 1907
Moths of Asia